The 2016–17 Arkansas–Pine Bluff Golden Lions men's basketball team represented the University of Arkansas at Pine Bluff during the 2016–17 NCAA Division I men's basketball season. The Golden Lions, led by ninth-year head coach George Ivory, played their home games at the K. L. Johnson Complex as members of the Southwestern Athletic Conference. They finished the season 7–25, 6–12 in SWAC play to finish in a tie for eighth place. They did not qualify for the SWAC tournament.

Previous season
The Golden Lions finished the 2015–16 season 8–25, 6–12 record in SWAC play to finish in a three-way tie for seventh place. They lost to Alabama A&M in the first round of the SWAC tournament.

Roster

Schedule and results

|-
!colspan=9 style=| Exhibition

|-
!colspan=9 style=| Non-conference regular season

|-
!colspan=9 style=| SWAC regular season

References

Arkansas–Pine Bluff Golden Lions men's basketball seasons
Arkansas-Pine Bluff
Gold
Gold